Vladimir Rikkanen (Russian name: Владимир Рикканен; born 25 October 1943) is a Soviet rower from Russia.

Rikkanen was born in Vologda, Russia in 1943. At the 1966 World Rowing Championships in Bled, he won silver with the men's eight. At the 1967 European Rowing Championships in Vichy, he won silver with the men's eight. He competed at the 1968 Summer Olympics in Mexico City with the men's coxless pair where they qualified for the small final but did not start. At the 1973 European Rowing Championships in Moscow, he won a bronze medal with the men's eight.

References

1943 births
Living people
Soviet male rowers
Olympic rowers of the Soviet Union
Rowers at the 1968 Summer Olympics
People from Vologda
European Rowing Championships medalists
World Rowing Championships medalists for the Soviet Union